This is a list of assets owned by German conglomerate Bertelsmann.

Arvato
Mohn Media Gruppe
Prinovis - joint-venture with Axel Springer and Gruner + Jahr
Sonopress in Germany, North America, Latin America, South Africa, Australia
Arvato Services
Arvato Systems
Arvato Mobile
Arvato Finances
empolis

Bertelsmann Printing Group
AZ Direct
Berryville Graphics
Campaign
Coral Graphics
DeutschlandCard
GGP Media
MBS Nürnberg
Mohn Media
Offset Paperback Manufacturers (OPM)
Prinovis
rtv media group
Sonopress
Vogel Druck

Direct Group
Bertelsmann BookClub (China)
Bertrand (Portugal)
BMG Music Service
BOL China
BOL Great Britain
BCA Great Britain 
 BDMI
Bookspan (United States) (50%)
Architects & Designers Book Service
Behavioral Science Book Club
Black Expressions
Book-of-the-Month Club
Children's Book-of-the-Month Club
Computer Books Direct
Country Homes & Gardens
Crafter's Choice
Discovery Channel Book Club
Doubleday Book Club
Doubleday Large Print
Early Childhood Teachers Club
Equestrian
The Good Cook
History Book Club
Intermediate & Middle Grades Book Club
The Library of Speech-Language Pathology
The Literary Guild
The Military Book Club
Mystery Guild
One Spirit
Outdoorsman's Edge
Nurse's Book Society
Primary Teachers' Book Club
Reader's Subscription
Rhapsody
Scientific American Book Club
Science Fiction Book Club
Circulo de Lectores (Spain)
Círculo de Leitores (Portugal)
Der Club (Germany)
Donauland (Austria)
ECI (Netherlands)
France Loisirs (France)
Quebec Loisirs  (Canada)
The BookClub  (Korea)
CDnow

RTL Group (75.1%)
Internet
Atresplayer
Flooxer
M6 
RTL.de
RTL.nl
Videoland.nl
sport.de
turbo.fr
Programming and Distribution
Fremantle
Original Productions
Amygdala Music
Random House Studio (transferred from Penguin Random House in 2016)
Random House Films
Random House Television
Buzzr
Naked Television (United Kingdom)
Naked West
Talkback (United Kingdom)
Thames (United Kingdom)
Hare and Tortoise (United Kingdom)
Castlefield (United Kingdom)
Moskito Television (Finland)
Rakett (Norway)
Wild Blue Media (United Kingdom)
One Big Happy Family (Norway)
Baluba (Sweden)
Monster AS (Norway)
Dr Pluto Films (United Kingdom)
Blu A/S (Denmark)
No Pictures Please (Netherlands)
Label1 (United Kingdom)
Strong Productions (Denmark)
Production House (Finland)
Novemberfilm (Norway)
Wildside (Italy)
Eureka Productions (Australia)
The Apartment Pictures (Italy)
Blue Circle (Netherlands)
Full Fat TV (United Kingdom)
Kwaï (France)
Miso Film (Denmark)
UFA Film & TV Productions (Germany)
UFA Fiction
UFA Serial Drama
UFA Show & Factual
UFA Documentary
Abot Hameiri Communication Ltd. (Israel)
Easy Tiger (Australia)
Wavy (Italy)
Fremantle Australia
Dancing Ledge Productions (United Kingdom)
Man Alive Entertainment (United Kingdom)
Grillifilms (Finland)
Playroom (Norway)
Strix Television (Sweden/Norway/Netherlands/Belgium)
The Immigrant (United States/Spain/Latin America)
Euston Films (United Kingdom)
Fiction Valley (Netherlands)
Element Pictures (Republic of Ireland)
Light House Cinema (Dublin)
Road House Cinema
Pálás Cinema (Galway)
Volta (Irish film VOD service)
Element Pictures Distribution
Radio
104.6 RTL (Berlin)
Antenne Bayern (Germany)
Antenne Mecklenburg (Germany)
Antenne Thueringen (Germany)
Bel RTL  (Belgium)
Radio Contact  (Belgium)
RTL Radio Letzebuerg  (Luxembourg)
Eldoradio  (Luxembourg)
Europa FM (Spain)
Fun Radio (France)
Hit-Radio Antenne (Germany)
Melodia FM (Spain)
Oldie 95 (Hamburg)
Onda Cero (Spain)
Radio Hamburg (Hamburg) 
Radio NRW (Germany)
Radio Ton (Germany)
RTL  (France)
RTL 2 (France)
RTL Radio - Deutschlands Hit-Radio (Germany, Belgium, northern France) 
Television
Atresmedia (Spain)
Antena 3
Atreseries
LaSexta
Neox
Nova
Mega
Atresmedia Cine
Atresmedia Studios
Groupe M6 (France)
M6
W9
6ter
Paris Première
Téva
M6 Music
Gulli
Canal J
Tiji
FC Girondins de Bordeaux
Série Club
M6 Films
Groupe MCM
MCM
MCM Top
RFM TV
Mediengruppe RTL Deutschland (Germany)
n-tv
RTL Television
RTLplus
RTL Crime (German TV channel)
RTL Living
RTL Passion
RTL Zwei
Super RTL
Toggo Plus
GEO Television
Nitro
VOX
RTL Magyarország (Hungary)
Cool TV
Film+
Muzsika TV
RTL Gold
RTL II
RTL Klub
RTL+
Sorozat+
RTL Nederland (The Netherlands)
RTL 4
RTL 5
RTL 7
RTL 8
RTL Z
RTL Telekids
RTL Crime
RTL Lounge
RTL XL
RTL Televizija (Croatia)
RTL 2
RTL Kockica
RTL Croatia World
RTL Télé Lëtzebuerg
RTL Zwee

Gruner + Jahr
Magazines 
Europe
Claudia (Poland)
Focus (Italy)  (50%)
Mia (Spain)
Muy Interesante (Spain)
Naj (Poland)
National Geographic (Poland)
News (Austria)(56.03%)
Tele-Loisirs  (France)
Top Girl (Italy)
TV Times (Austria) (56.03%)
Germany
art
Brigitte
Capital
Eltern
Essen & Trinken
P.M.
Schöner Wohnen
Stern
Newspapers
Sächsische Zeitung (60%)

Penguin Random House
Dorling Kindersley Limited
Alpha Books
DK Eyewitness Travel
Knopf Doubleday Publishing Group
Alfred A. Knopf
Anchor Books
Black Swan
Corgi
Doubleday
Everyman's Library
Nan A. Talese
Pantheon
Schocken
Vintage Books
Vintage Crime/Black Lizard
Vintage Español
Penguin Publishing Group
Avery Publishing
Berkley Books
Ace Books
Jove Books
New American Library
Plume
Obsidian
Onyx
Roc Books
Signet Books
Signet Classics
Signet Fiction
Topaz
DAW
Dutton
Family Tree Books
G. P. Putnam's Sons
Amy Enborne
Marian Wood
Coward-McCann
Krause Publications
Impact Books
Interweave
North Light Books
Pelican Books
Penguin Books
Awa Press
Michael Joseph
Penguin General
Fig Tree Books
Hamish Hamilton
Penguin Life
Penguin Business
Sandycove Books
Viking Books UK
Penguin Press
Allen Lane Books
Particular Books
Pelican Books
Penguin Classics
Pamela Dorman Books
Popular Woodworking Books
Portfolio
Riverhead Books
Sentinel
Square Peg
TarcherPerigee
Transworld Publishers
Viking Press
Vintage Classics
Vintage Paperback
Writer's Digest Books
Yellow Jersey
Penguin Random House Digital Publishing Group
Books on Tape
Listening Library
Living Language
Penguin Random House Audio Publishing
Penguin Random House Puzzles & Games
Penguin Audio
Random House Audio
Random House Large Print
Random House Reference
Sasquatch Books
Little Bigfoot
Spruce Books
Penguin Random House International
Zahar
Penguin Random House Australia
Penguin Books Australia
Penguin Random House Canada
Anchor Canada
Appetite by Random House
Bond Street Books
Doubleday Canada
Hamish Hamilton Canada
Knopf Canada
McClelland & Stewart
Douglas Gibson Books
Emblem Books
New Canadian Library
Tundra Books
Penguin Canada
Penguin Teen
Puffin Canada
Random House Canada
Signal
Strange Light
Viking Canada
Vintage Canada
Penguin Random House Group (UK)
Cornerstone Publishing
Arrow
Young Arrow
Century
Del Rey UK
Hutchinson
Random House UK
William Heinemann
 #Merky Books
Random House Business
Windmill
Ebury Publishing
BBC Books
Ebury Press
Ebury Edge
Pop Press
Rider
Vermilion
Virgin Books (90%)
WH Allen
Witness Books
Penguin Random House Audio (UK)
BBC Audio
The Penguin Podcast
Vintage Publishing UK
The Bodley Head
Chatto & Windus
Harvill Secker
Hogarth Press
Jonathan Cape
Square Peg
Penguin Random House Grupo Editorial (Spain/Portugal/Latin America)
Aguliar
Alfaguara
Ediciones B
B de Bloke
B de Books
B de Bolsillo
B Comic
Ediciones Cliper
Cliper+
Ediciones Salamandra
Companhia das Letras (70%)
Editorial Bruguera
Editorial Molino
Editorial Sudamericana
Editorial Grijabo
Grupo Santillana
Lumen
Objetiva
Penguin Clasicos
Plaza & Janés
Random Cómics
Suma de Letras 
Taurus
Penguin Random House India
Duckbill Books
Penguin Random House New Zealand
Penguin Random House Struik (South Africa)
Transworld Ireland
Verlasgsgruppe Penguin Random House (Germany)
Anaconda Verlag
Ariston
Arkana Verlag
Bassermann
Blanvalet
Blessing Verlag
Btb Verlag
carl's books
C. Bertelsmann Verlag
Der Audio Verlag
der Hörverlag
Deutsche Verlag-Anstalt
Diana Verlag
Diederichs
Goldmann
Gütersloher Verlagshaus
Heyne Publishing
Heyne Hardcore
Heyne fliegt
Luchterhand Literaturverlag
Manesse Verlag
Pantheon Verlag
Penguin JUNIOR
Penguin Verlag
Penhaligon
Prestel Publishing
Random House Audio (Germany)
Reimann Verlag
Siedler Verlag
Südwest-Verlag
Wunderraum
Yuna Publishing
Penguin Young Readers Group
Dial Books for Young Readers
Dutton Children's Books
Firebird Books
Frederick Warne & Co.
G. P. Putnam's Sons Books for Young Readers
Grosset & Dunlap
Charter Books (Ace Charter)
Bedtime Stories
Junior Library
Platt & Mutt
Kathy Dawson Books
Koklia
Ladybird Books
Nancy Paulsen Books
Penguin Workshop
Philomel Books
Price Stern Sloan
Puffin Books
Razorbill
Viking Children's Books
Random House
Crown Publishing Group
Amphoto Books
Broadway Books
Clarkson Potter
Convergent Books
Crown
Crown Archetype
Crown Forum
Currency
Harmony Books
Hogarth Press
Image Catholic Books
Multnomah
Random House Books USA
Rodale Books
Ten Speed Press
Lorena Jones Books
Watson-Guptill
Three Rivers Press
Tim Duggan Books
WaterBrook
Multnomah
Random House Publishing Group
Ballantine Books
Del Rey Books
LucasBooks
Bantam Books
Bantam Press
Spectra
Dell Publishing
Dial Press
Loveswept & Flirt
Modern Library
One World
Spiegel & Grau
SPJ For Horgath
Random House Children's Books
Alfred A. Knopf Books for Young Readers
Anne Schwartz Books
Skylark
Bluefire
Crown Books for Young Readers
Doubleday Children's Books
Delacorte Press
Dragonfly Books
Ember
Golden Books
Laurel-Leaf Books
Lee Wade
Little Tiger Press
The Princeton Review
Random House Books for Young Readers
Sylvan Learning
Wendy Lamb Books
Yearling Books

BMG

Music publishers
 Bug Music
 Crosstown Songs
 Cherry Lane Music Publishing
 Chrysalis Music Group
 Stage Three Music
 Evergreen Copyrights
 Famous Music UK
 R2M
 Sony/ATV Music Publishing (Select songwriters)
 Virgin Music

Labels
50/50 Global Muzik Inc and 50/50 Global EDM
Albert Music
Broken Bow Records
Disques Dreyfus
Double U Records (Founded by Jacob Whitesides)
Dutchess Music (Founded by Fergie)
The Echo Label
The End Records
Hal David
Infectious Records
Mute Records
Noise Records
Neon Nation Corporation
Paracadute (Founded by OK GO)
RAM Records
Rise Records
Rhythm Nation (Founded by Janet Jackson)
S-Curve Records
Sanctuary Records
Sedona Recording Company
Skint Records
Strictly Rhythm
Vagrant Records
Victory Records
Verse Music Group
 ZTT Records

See also
Lists of corporate assets

References

 
Bertelsmann